Maurice Yaffé (1944/45 - 27 October 1989) was a British psychologist who was Principal Clinical Psychologist at Guy's Hospital. He studied the psychology of sex and fear of flying, and served on the British Olympic Association's medical advisory committee.

In the 1970s he worked on the Longford Report.

His book "Sexual Happiness: a practical approach" was described as pervaded by a "healthy optimism".

Books

References

British psychologists
1940s births
1989 deaths

Year of birth uncertain